The 1925 Chicago Maroons football team was an American football team that represented the University of Chicago during the 1925 Big Ten Conference football season In their 34th season under head coach Amos Alonzo Stagg, the Maroons compiled a 3–4–1 record, finished fourth in the Big Ten Conference, and were outscored by their opponents by a combined total of 76 to 44.

Fritz Crisler was an assistant coach on the team.

Schedule

References

Chicago
Chicago Maroons football seasons
Chicago Maroons football